Eucithara coronata is a small sea snail, a marine gastropod mollusk in the family Mangeliidae.

Distribution
This genus is found in the subtidal zone on sandy bottoms between 10 and 30 m in depth. It occurs in Mozambique, the Red Sea to Australia, Polynesia, Hawaii and the Philippines.

Description
The shell size is between 10 and 18 mm. The conical shell has an axial sculpture with six prominent axial ribs that are slightly concave at the shoulder.
There are only a few whorls, showing deep sutures, and a large body whorl. The aperture is long and narrow. The color of the shell is creamy white.

References

 Description of Eucithara coronata
 Bouge, L.J. & Dautzenberg, P.L. 1914. Les Pleurotomides de la Nouvelle-Caledonie et de ses dependances. Journal de Conchyliologie 61: 123-214
 Kilburn R.N. 1992. Turridae (Mollusca: Gastropoda) of southern Africa and Mozambique. Part 6. Subfamily Mangeliinae, section 1. Annals of the Natal Museum, 33: 461–575. page(s): 488-494

External links
  Tucker, J.K. 2004 Catalog of recent and fossil turrids (Mollusca: Gastropoda). Zootaxa 682:1-1295.
 Smith, Barry D. "Prosobranch gastropods of Guam." Micronesica 35.36 (2003): 244-270. 

coronata